The San Carlos Stakes is an American Thoroughbred horse race once held during the third week of February at Santa Anita Park in Arcadia, California, but now run in March. The Grade II stakes race is open to horses, aged three and up, willing to race seven furlongs on the dirt and currently offers a purse of $200,000.

Inaugurated in 1935 as the San Carlos Handicap, it was raced at a distance of  miles through 1939. It was run in both January and December 1949. It became known as the San Carlos Stakes beginning with its 2012 running.

It wasn't raced due to World War II between 1942 and 1945.

Records
Speed record: (at current distance of 7 furlongs)
 1:20.2 – Flying Paster (1981)

Most wins:
 2 – Autocrat (1948, 1949)
 2 – Porterhouse (1955, 1956)
 2 – Native Diver (1965, 1967)
 2 – Rising Market (1969, 1970)
 2 – Surf Cat (2006, 2008)
 2 – Sahara Sky (2013,2014)

Most wins by a jockey:
 8 – Laffit Pincay Jr. (1969, 1970, 1974, 1975, 1976, 1980, 1984, 1986)

Most wins by a trainer:
 6 – Charles Whittingham (1955, 1956, 1960, 1971, 1988, 1993)

Most wins by an owner:
 2 – Alfred G. Vanderbilt II (1936, 1954)
 2 – Baroni & Battilana (1948, 1949)
 2 – Fred W. Hooper (1963, 1964)
 2 – M/M Louis K. Shapiro (1965, 1967)
 2 – M/M Bert W. Martin (1966, 1969)
 2 – Aase Headley/Marsha Naify (2006, 2008)

Winners

 † In 1973, Kennedy Road won the race but was disqualified from first to second.† Race run on December 31, 1949.

References

 The 2009 San Carlos Handicap at the NTRA

Horse races in California
Santa Anita Park
Graded stakes races in the United States
Flat horse races for four-year-olds
Open mile category horse races
Recurring sporting events established in 1935
1935 establishments in California